Rađevina is an area in northwestern Serbia between mountains Vlašić, Cer, Jagodnje and Soko. Along with the Azbukovica they form the Upper Drina region. Rađevina is predominantly hilly and mountainous region full of forests and pastures with clear and rapid streams. The highest peak is Košutnja stopa on the mountain Jagodnja (940 m).

Its largest part belongs to the municipality of Krupanj, consisting of 22 villages: Banjevac, Bela Crkva, Bogoštica, Brezovice, Brštica, Vrbić, Palatine, Zavlaka, Kostajnik, Krasava, Kržava, Likodra, Lipenović, Mojković, Planina, Ravnaja, Stave, Tolisavac, Tomanj, Cvetulja, Cerova, Šljivova and a town of Krupanj, which is the economic, cultural and political center of the municipality.

References 

Geographical regions of Serbia